Euan Mackintosh is a rugby sevens coach. He is the Head Coach of the Chinese women's national sevens team.

Biography 
Mackintosh first played rugby at Highland Rugby Club and was on the team at university in Edinburgh where he was studying physical education. He played rugby in New Zealand before going to Australia in 2008. He then played for a semi professional rugby club in France. He began his coaching career at Saint-Étienne.

Mackintosh moved to New Zealand, where he coached at Tauranga Sports Rugby Club in Bay of Plenty. He coached in their Sevens Programme and helped the Under-19s to a national championship.

Mackintosh was appointed as Head Coach of China's women's national rugby sevens team in 2020 and helped them qualify for their first Olympics. They finished in seventh place.

References 

Living people
British Olympic coaches
China national rugby sevens team coaches
Scottish rugby union coaches
Year of birth missing (living people)